Temptation Come My Way is The Showdown's second album.  It features a more focused sound than their previous album, which was a fusion of various heavy metal genres. The sound of Temptation Come My Way is southern rock combined with more traditional heavy metal.  It is also the last album to feature Andrew Hall, before being replaced by former Still Remains drummer AJ Barrette.

Track listing
 "Fanatics & Whores" (3:18)
 "Head Down" (4:19)
 "Six Feet Under" (4:04)
 "We Die Young" (4:18)
 "Breath Of The Swamp" (3:16)
 "It Drinks From Me" (4:36)
 "Temptation Come My Way" (4:12)
 "Forget My Name" (4:22)
 "Spitting In The Wind" (3:15)
 "I, Victim (Here's To The Year)" (3:43)
 "Carry On Wayward Son" (Kansas Cover) (4:21)
 "Death Finds Us Breathing" (4:11)

Alt. Tracks Version

 "Head Down" (4:19)
 "Six Feet Under" (4:04)
 "We Die Young" (4:18)
 "Breath of the Swamp" (3:16)
 "It Drinks From Me" (4:36)
 "Temptation Come My Way" (4:12)
 "Forget My Name" (4:22)
 "Spitting In The Wind" (3:15)
 "I, Victim (Here's To The Year)" (3:43)
 "Carry On Wayward Son" (4:21)
 "Death Finds Us Breathing" (4:11)

Bonus tracks
Best Buy - "Snake in the Grass" (2:39)
iTunes and Century Media European version - "Feel Like Hell" (4:03)

Trivia
The track "Fanatics & Whores" is not included on the album sold in Family Christian Stores or Lifeway stores. It also does not appear on the album sold by online distributor Zambooie, even though it is listed as being on the CD in their product description.

Credits

The Showdown
 David Bunton - Vocals
 Josh Childers - Guitar
 Travis Bailey - Guitar
 A.J. Barrette - Drums 
 Eric Korshack - Bass
Production
 Adam Deane - Assistant
 Scott Hardin - Engineer, Backing Vocals
 Paul Ebersold - Engineer, Producer
 J.R. McNeely - Mixing
 Brad Moist - A&R
 Clark Orr - Design
 Dan Shike - Mastering
 Steve Blackmon - Assistant

References

External links
 Album site

2007 albums
The Showdown (band) albums
Mono vs Stereo albums